Pavo is a genus of two species in the pheasant family. The two species, along with the Congo peafowl, are known as peafowl.

Taxonomy
Pavo is also Spanish for turkey. The genus Pavo was introduced in 1758 by the Swedish naturalist Carl Linnaeus in the tenth edition of his Systema Naturae. The genus name is the Latin word for a peacock. The type species is the Indian peafowl (Pavo cristatus).

Species
The genus contains two species.

Fossil record
 Pavo bravardi (Bravard's peafowl) (Early – Late Pliocene) – Gallus moldovicus, sometimes misspelt moldavicus, may be a junior synonym
 Gallus aesculapii, a Late Miocene – Early Pliocene "junglefowl" of Greece, may also have been a peafowl
In the Pliocene on the Balkan Peninsula, Bravard's peafowl coexisted with ptarmigans (Lagopus sp.) Peafowl were widespread on the Balkan Peninsula and in Southeastern Europe until the end of the Pliocene.

References

External links
White Peacocks Information

Pavo (genus)
Bird genera